Uncisudis quadrimaculata is a species of barracudina. It is found in the  Atlantic Ocean.

Size

References 

Paralepididae
Taxa named by Alfred Post (zoologist)
Fish described in 1969
Fish of the Atlantic Ocean